The 1994 Liga Perdana season was the inaugural season of the Liga Perdana, a newly-created professional football league in Malaysia. A total of 16 teams participated in the league with 14 teams from Malaysia, along with Singapore and Brunei. It was also the last season that a Singapore-based team played in the Malaysian league until a return with LionsXII in 2012.

The season kicked off in 1994. Singapore dominated the season and ended up winning the title, ahead of Kedah and Sarawak, while Brunei finished last.

Teams
 Brunei
 Johor
 Kedah
 Kelantan
 Kuala Lumpur
 Malacca
 Negeri Sembilan
 Pahang
 Perak
 Perlis
 Pulau Pinang
 Sabah
 Sarawak
 Selangor
 Singapore
 Terengganu

Final standings
1.  Singapore - 59 PTS

2. Kedah - 57 PTS

3. Sarawak - 55 PTS

4. Sabah - 49 PTS

5. Pahang - 46 PTS

6. Selangor - 44 PTS

7. Terengganu - 43 PTS

8. Johor - 41 PTS

9. Kelantan - 40 PTS

10. Perak - 35 PTS

11. Kuala Lumpur - 33 PTS

12. Negeri Sembilan - 31 PTS

13. Malacca - 31 PTS

14. Perlis - 20 PTS

15. Pulau Pinang - 19 PTS

16.  Brunei - 13 PTS

Champions

References

Liga Perdana (1994–1997) seasons
1
Malaysia